Ken Selzer (born April 25, 1953) is an American politician who served as the Kansas Insurance Commissioner from 2015 to 2019. He ran for Governor of Kansas in the 2018 gubernatorial election and came in fourth in the Republican primary with 7.82% of the vote. Selzer previously served as a Fairway, Kansas, City Councilman and City Council President.

References

1953 births
Kansas city council members
Kansas Insurance Commissioners
Kansas Republicans
Kansas State University alumni
Living people
Marshall School of Business alumni
People from Johnson County, Kansas
People from Marion County, Kansas